Rockwell is an English surname. Notable people with the surname include:

 Dick Rockwell (1920–2006), American comic strip and comic book artist, nephew of Norman Rockwell
 Francis W. Rockwell (politician) (1844–1929), American politician
 Francis W. Rockwell (1886–1979), American Navy Admiral
 George Lincoln Rockwell (1918–1967), American politician and Neo-Nazi leader
 George Lovejoy Rockwell (1889–1978), American vaudeville performer and radio personality
 Irvin E. Rockwell (1862–1952), American politician
 Julius Rockwell (1805–1888), American politician
 Lew Rockwell (born 1944), American author and political consultant
 Norman Rockwell (1894–1978), American painter and illustrator
 Porter Rockwell (c.1815–1878), American bodyguard and frontiersman
 Sam Rockwell (born 1968), American actor
Stuart W. Rockwell (1917–2011), American politician
 Thomas Rockwell (born 1933), American author and son of Norman Rockwell
 Willard Rockwell (1888–1978), American businessman and engineer
 William W. Rockwell (1824–1894), American politician

English-language surnames